There is another Town of Monroe and the City of Monroe in Green County, Wisconsin.

Monroe is a town in Adams County in the U.S. state of Wisconsin. The population was 398 as of the 2010 census. In 2019 this figure was 10,625. The unincorporated community of Monroe Center is located in the town.

Geography
Monroe is located in northwestern Adams County, along Petenwell Lake, a large reservoir on the Wisconsin River.

Demographics
As of the census of 2000, there were 363 people, 168 households, and 127 families residing in the town. The population density was 16.6 people per square mile (6.4/km2).  There were 402 housing units at an average density of 18.4 per square mile (7.1/km2). The racial makeup of the town was 99.45% White, 0.28% Native American and 0.28% Asian. Hispanic or Latino of any race were 0.55% of the population.

There were 168 households, out of which 15.5% had children under the age of 18 living with them, 68.5% were married couples living together, 3.0% had a female householder with no husband present, and 24.4% were non-families. 23.2% of all households were made up of individuals, and 9.5% had someone living alone who was 65 years of age or older. The average household size was 2.16 and the average family size was 2.48.

In the town, the population was spread out, with 14.3% under the age of 18, 5.0% from 18 to 24, 21.8% from 25 to 44, 35.0% from 45 to 64, and 24.0% who were 65 years of age or older. The median age was 53 years. For every 100 females, there were 96.2 males. For every 100 females age 18 and over, there were 100.6 males.

The median income for a household in the town was $34,500, and the median income for a family was $37,250. Males had a median income of $36,806 versus $25,893 for females. The per capita income for the town was $19,970. About 4.8% of families and 7.3% of the population were below the poverty line, including 12.7% of those under age 18 and 3.7% of those age 65 or over.

References

Towns in Adams County, Wisconsin
Towns in Wisconsin